Fatehgarh Sahib is a city and a sacred pilgrimage site of Sikhism in the north west Indian state of Punjab. Fatehgarh Sahib is named after Fateh Singh, the 7-year-old son of Guru Gobind Singh, who was seized and buried alive, along with his 9-year-old brother Zoravar Singh, by the Mughals under the orders of governor Wazir Khan during the ongoing Mughal-Sikh wars of the early 18th century. The town experienced major historical events after the martyrdom of the sons in 1705, with frequent changes of control between the Sikhs and Mughals.

The town features historic Gurdwaras, including the underground Bhora Sahib marking the location where the two boys refused to convert to Islam and fearlessly accepted being bricked alive. In contemporary times, the town is the site of educational institutions such as the SGPC run Guru Granth Sahib University and Baba Banda Singh Bahadur Engineering College.

History
It is a major pilgrimage center in Sikhism.

The Gurdwara Fatehgarh Sahib is the major landmark in the town. It marks the location where two youngest sons of Guru Gobind Singh Ji – 7-year-old Baba Fateh Singh Ji and 9-year-old Baba Zorawar Singh Ji– were betrayed by their cook and servant Gangu to the Mughal army, seized, asked to convert to Islam and when they refused they were buried alive under the orders of Wazir Khan. Their martyrdom on 9 December 1705 has been remembered by the Sikhs by naming the site as Fatehgarh after the youngest boy killed, and by building a large Gurdwara in 1843. The town is also the location where the Sikhs took revenge by capturing it from Wazir Khan in 1710 and killing him. However, the Sikh militia was defeated again few years later and the town remained in the control of Muslim rulers, including later an appointee of Ahmed Shah Durrani till 1764, when Khalsa recaptured it by defeating and killing the appointee Zain Khan.

Places of worship

The town is home to major Sikh Gurdwaras:
Bhora Sahib: the underground location within Fatehgarh Sahib Gurdwara where the two sons were buried alive. This monument was built by Karam Singh of Patiala in early 19th-century.
Fatehgarh Sahib Gurdwara: the main Sikh temple in the town, in whose basement is Bhora Sahib. The Gurdwara stands on a high point of the town, has an Indo-Islamic architecture with a square plan, a ribbed lotus dome and cusped arches. The floor is made of marble and is decorated with a mosaic. It is three storeyed consisting of a basement, a central pavilion and dome level above. The basement has a copy of the Sikh scripture, Khalsa swords, dagger and other holy historic relics. It is marked with silence, usually with visitors as well as pilgrims seated and praying. The upper level with the central pavilion also houses the Guru Granth Sahib and features kirtan singing. The upper levels and domes were added by Yadavinder Singh in 1955, after India gained its independence from the colonial British Empire.
At this place, Mata Gujri – the mother of Guru Gobind Singh, and her two youngest grandchildren, Fateh Singh and Zorawar Singh were cremated.
Gurdwara Bimangarh is close to the Fatehgarh Sahib Gurdwara. It is a location where the dead bodies of the two children and their grandmother was kept for the night before the cremation.
Banda Bahadur platform is believed in the Sikh tradition as the place where 6,000 Sikhs died fighting the Muslim army in the Battle of Chapparchiri.

There also exists remains of an ancient Royal inn in the city named Aam Khas Bagh that was initially built by Akbar and rebuilt by Mughal Emperor Shah Jahan.

Shaheedi Jor Mel
Every year between 11th and 14th of the month of Poh (usually about 25 to 27 December), Fatehgarh Sahib is the pilgrimage site for many Sikhs who visit it to remember the martyrdom, locally known as Shaheedi Jor Mel of the sons of Guru Gobind Singh.

Todar Mal Haveli
 Todarmal, who is most remembered for defying the Mughals by arranging for the cremation of young martyred sons of Guru Gobind Singh and his mother, had a haveli that still exists, Todar Mal Haveli.

See also
Anandpur Sahib
Harmandir Sahib
Sirhind-Fategarh
History of Sirhind

References

Citations

Sources

External links
 Official website
 Materializing Sikh Pasts, Anne Murphy (2006)

 
Cities and towns in Fatehgarh Sahib district

nl:Fatehgarh Sahib (district)
pa:ਫਤੇਹਗਢ੍ਹ ਸਾਹਿਬ ਜਿਲਾ